The Bennett Community School District is a public school district headquartered in Bennett, Iowa.  The district spans eastern Louisa County and western Scott County, and serves the towns of Bennett and New Liberty, and the surrounding rural areas.

Lonnie Luepker, superintendent of Calamus–Wheatland, has served as superintendent through a sharing agreement since 2019.

Schools
The district operates a single elementary school in Bennett:
 Bennett Elementary School

Students from Bennett attend secondary school at Durant.

References

External links
 Bennett Community School District

School districts in Iowa
Education in Cedar County, Iowa
Education in Scott County, Iowa